North Carolina Science Olympiad (NCSO) is a nonprofit organization with the mission to attract and retain the pool of K–12 students entering science, technology, engineering, and mathematics (STEM) degrees and careers in North Carolina. Every year NCSO hosts tournaments on university, community college, and public school campuses across the state. These tournaments are rigorous academic interscholastic competitions that consist of a series of different hands-on, interactive, challenging and inquiry-based events that are well balanced between the various disciplines of biology, earth science, environmental science, chemistry, physics, engineering and technology. NCSO is housed at The Science House at NC State University.

History 
The first recorded Science Olympiad was held on Saturday, November 23, 1974, at St. Andrews Presbyterian College in Laurinburg, North Carolina. Dr. Donald Barnes and Dr. David Wetmore were the originators of this event. Fifteen schools from North and South Carolina participated in this event. This Olympiad was a day-long affair, with competitions and demonstrations for high school students in the areas of biology, chemistry, and physics. There were four event periods during this day, and each event period had one fun event (like beaker race or paper airplane), one demonstration (like glassblowing and holography), and one serious event (like periodic table quiz or Science Bowl). An article was published in the Journal of Chemical Education in January 1978 documenting the success of recruiting students through Science Olympiad. St. Andrews continues to host a Science Olympiad tournament to this day.

John C. "Jack" Cairns was a teacher at Dover High School in Delaware in the 1970s when he learned about Science Olympiad taking place in North Carolina. He shared this information with Dr. Douglas R. Macbeth, the Delaware State Science Supervisor. Cairns was appointed to a steering committee to organize the first Olympiad in Delaware which took place at Delaware State University in the Spring of 1977.

By 1982, word about Science Olympiad continued to spread, and caught the attention of Dr. Gerard Putz in Macomb County, Michigan. Putz invited Cairns to share the success of the Delaware Science Olympiad with Macomb County. As a result, Michigan hosted their first two tournaments in 1983 and 1984 while at the same time Delaware hosted eight similar tournaments. Putz and Cairns then decided to share the program with the rest of the nation.

Competition 
Score is calculated by giving 1 point for a first-place finish, 2 points for a second-place finish, etc.
In final events standings, (D) denotes defending champions.

NCSO competitions are run in a style similar to a track meet. Each competitor has individual events that they compete in, instead of shot put and javelin, a competitor would participate in Forensics and Tower Building. Competitors receive individual rankings in each individual event they compete in, and at the end of the day all the individual event rankings are added together to get the total Team Score. Competitors are able to earn medals in their individual events, and teams can also win an overall trophy for their school.

Science Olympiad tournaments have four different time periods (and walk-in time periods) when events are held. Due to the number of teams at the state tournament (118 division C teams at the 2015 tournament), the events are instead divided into six time periods of 70 minutes. Most events allow teams of two students to compete (some events allow three).

Regional Tournament host sites include Campbell University, Catawba Valley Community College, Cumberland County Schools, East Carolina University, Fayetteville Technical Community College, Green Hope High School, Guilford County Schools, Lenoir Community College, Lenoir-Rhyne University, St. Andrews University, New Hanover County Schools, Raleigh Charter High School, UNC-Asheville, UNC-Charlotte, UNC-Greensboro, and UNC-Wilmington.  The North Carolina State Tournament is hosted at NC State University each April.  The top scoring teams at the state level advance to the national competition, held every May. State tournament results are seen below.

2021 Competition

2019 Competition

2018 Competition

2017 Competition

Events 
The competitive events of NCSO align with the North Carolina Standard Course of Study as well as the National Science Education Standards. The events are designed to enhance and strengthen both science content and process skills. Every year NCSO replaces some of the events issued by the National Science Olympiad organization with events that are of local interest to North Carolina. The 18 elementary, 23 middle, and 23 high school events for each competitive year are announced in early Fall. This is followed by a series of workshops as competitors prepare for their events. Tournaments take place in the Spring, starting with school wide and Regional tournaments, advancing through State and National Tournaments.  In the Summer camps are offered across North Carolina.

The 64 events of NCSO range from engineering events like Mystery Architecture, Towers and Helicopters to content events such as Microbe Mission, Forensics, and Ecology. The events change each year as new topics are rotated in and old topics rotate out, to ensure every part of curriculum is covered.

Participation 
In 2011, more than 600 K–12 schools representing over 10,000 students and 65 counties in North Carolina participated in North Carolina Science Olympiad activities.

Teams may be organized by any charter school, home school group, private or public school. Schools may have as many teams as they wish, the first team from a school is considered the Varsity team and all other teams are Junior Varsity teams. Teams are overseen by a coach.

Divisions 
Division A2 encompasses grades 3–6, Division B involves grades 6–9, and Division C involves grades 9–12. Teams at all three levels consist of eighteen competitors each in North Carolina. 

The National tournament team consists of up to fifteen competitors.

References

External links 
 North Carolina Science Olympiad
 North Carolina State University

Education in North Carolina
Non-profit organizations based in North Carolina